

Introduction 
Established in 1906, the Minister of Justice is responsible for prosecuting government cases.  In other words, the justice minister is the attorney-general of the country.  However, he has nothing to do with policing which is the responsibility of the Interior Minister of the Islamic Republic of Iran.

The ministry's headquarters was opened in 1938 and reflects pure European architectural style.

List of ministers
The ministers have included the following:

 Nizam el Mulk (1906)
Ahmad Moshir al-Saltaneh (1906-1907) [1st official Minister of Justice]
Abdolhusein Mirza Farmanfarma (1907)
Mohammad Ali Khan Ala al-Saltaneh (1907)
Seyyed Mahmood Khan 'Ala ul-Molk (1907)
Mirza Hasan Khan Pirnia (Moshir ul-Dowleh) (1907)
Nezam ul-Molk (1907)
Mehdi Qoli Hedayat (1907)
Mohtasham ul-Saltaneh (1907)
Mokhber ul-Molk (1907)
Mehdi Qoli Khan Mokhber ul-Saltaneh (1907-1908)
Mokhber ul-Saltaneh (1908)
Mo'ayed ul-Saltaneh (1908)
Mohtashem ul-Saltaneh (1908-1909)
Ahmad Qavam (1909-1910)
Vosooq ul-Dowleh (1910)
Mirza Hassan Khan Esfandiary (1910-1911)
Mohammed- 'Ali Khan Zoka' al-Molk (1911-1912)
Esmail Momtaz od-Dowleh (1912)
Mohammad Ali Foroughi (1913-1914)
Mohammed- 'Ali Khan Zoka' al-Molk (1914-1915)
Fat'hollah Khan Sardar Mansur (1915)
 Mohammed Ali Khan 'Ala' ul-Saltaneh (1915-1916)
 Mahmood Khan 'Ala' ul-Molk (1916)
 Seyyed Hasan Modarres (1916)
Firouz Nosrat-ed-Dowleh III (1916-1917)
Esmail Momtaz od-Dowleh (1917)
 Nasr ul-Molk (1917)
 Mokhber ul-Saltaneh (1917-1918)
 Nasr ul-Molk (1918)
Firouz Nosrat-ed-Dowleh III (1918-1920)
Mossadegh-ol-Saltaneh (1920)
 Soleiman Khan (1920-1921)
 Salar Lashkar (1921)
 Mostafa Adl (1921)
 Ebrahim 'Amid (1921-1922)
Abdolhossein Teymourtash (1922)
 Moshar ul-Saltaneh (1922)
 Sardar Mo'azzam Khorasani (1922)
 Moshar ul-Saltaneh (1922-1923)
 Momtaz ul-Molk (1923)
 'Amid ul-Saltaneh (1923)
 Ebrahim Khan Hakim ul-Molk (1923)
 Mo'azed ul-Saltaneh (1923-1925)
Firouz Nosrat-ed-Dowleh III (1925)
 'Emad ul-Saltaneh Fatemi (1925-1926)
Mohsen Sadr (1926)
 Mostafa Adl (1926-1927)
Vossug ed Dowleh (1926-1927)
Ali-Akbar Davar (1926-1927)
Ahmad Matin-Daftari (1927-1933)
Mohsen Sadr (1933-1935)
Ahmad Matin-Daftari  (1935-1940)
 Majid Ahi (1940-1941)
 Mohammed Soruri (1940-1941)
 'Ali Hey'at (1940-1941)
 Majid Ahi (1941-1942)
 Abbas Qoli Golshaian (1941-1942)
 Majid Ahi (1942)
Mohsen Sadr (1942)
 'Ali Asghar Hekmat (1942)
 Asadullah Mameqani (1942-1943)
Mohsen Sadr (1942-1943)
Allah-Yar Saleh  (1943-1944)
 Mostafa Adl (1944-1945)
Allah-Yar Saleh (1945)
 Amanollah Ardalan (1945)
 Hasan'ali Kamal Hedayar (1945)
Allah-Yar Saleh (1946)
Ali Akbar Musavi Zadeh (1946-1947)
Mohammed Soruri (1947-1948)
Nezam ul-Saltaneh (1948)
Abbas Qoli Golshaian (1948)
Sajjadi (1948-1950)
Mohammed 'Ali Buzari (1950-1951)
Jamal Akhavi (1951)
Ali Heyat (1951)
Shamseddin Amir-Alaei (1951-1952)
Abdolali Lotfi (1952-1953)
Jamal Akhavi (1953-1955)
Fakhr ul-Din Shadman (1953-1955)
Abbas Quli Golshaian (1955-1957)
Ali Amini (1955-1957)
Mohammad Ali Hedayati (1957-1961)
Mohammad 'Ali Momtaz (1961)
Husein Najafi (1961)
Nour ul-Din Alamuti (1961-1962)
Mohammad Baheri (1962-1964)
Gholamhusein Khoshbin (1962-1964)
Baqer Amali (1964-1966)
Javad Sadr (1967-1968)
Manuchehr Parto (1968-1970)
Sadeq Ahmadi (1972-1976)
Mundhir al-Shawi (1976)
Qolam Reza Kianpur (1977-1978)
 Mohammed Baheri (1978)
 Husein Najafi (1978-1979)
 Yahya Sadeq Vaziri (1979)
 Asadollah Mobasheri (1979)
 Ahmad Sayyed Javadi (1979)
Judicial Council under observation of Mohammad Beheshti (1979-1980)
 Ebrahim Ahadi (1980-1981)
 Mohammad Asghari (1981-1984)
 Hassan Habibi (1984-1989)
 Esmail Shooshtari (1989-2005)
 Jamal Karimi-Rad (2005-2006)
 Gholam-Hossein Elham (2006-2009)
 Morteza Bakhtiari (2009-2013)
 Mostafa Pourmohammadi (2013-2017)
 Alireza Avayi (2017–2021)
 Amin Hossein Rahimi (2021–present)

See also

General Inspection Office (Iran)
Justice ministry
Ministry of Interior (Iran)
Ministry of Intelligence (Iran)
Politics of Iran

References

External links

1906 establishments in Iran
Ministry of Justice
Iran
Justice
Ministries established in 1906
Ministers of Justice of Iran